John Minor Maury (1795 – 23 June 1824) was a lieutenant in the United States Navy. What has been described as "a very interesting sketch" of his career was given by James Edmonds Saunders in his late 19th-century work Early Settlers of Alabama.

Biography
John's life was saved by David Porter, USN, of the ship, Essex. John and other sailors (five killed by cannibals and two survived) had been marooned on the island of Nuku Hiva (also spelled "Nukahiva" or "Nookahevah") for two years surviving cannibalism between the wars of the Typees against the Happhas. They had been left on the island to gather sandalwood to sell in China when the war with England broke out and blockaded their ship that was to come back for them.

A grandson of James Maury, John was the older brother of oceanographer and naval officer Commodore Matthew Fontaine Maury, and entered the United States navy as a midshipman when thirteen years old. It is reported that "He then had thrilling adventures in the South Seas, was with David Porter in the Essex during the bloody battle with the English at Valparaiso, and afterwards fought with Macdonough in the Battle of Lake Champlain".  John Minor Maury's letters of his adventures in the navy that were sent home are considered to be a major reason why Matthew Maury decided on a naval career.

John Minor Maury was also the father of USA and later CSA Major General Dabney Herndon Maury, who founded (1868-9) the Southern Historical Society, worked on it for 20 years, and was appointed to serve as U.S. Minister to Colombia, South America by President Grover Cleveland.

Born very near Fredericksburg, Virginia, to Richard Maury (son of Rev. James Maury) and Diana (Minor) Maury (daughter of General John Minor). John Minor Maury was appointed midshipman on 16 January 1809 and commissioned Lieutenant 28 June 1811. He married Eliza Herndon Maury, daughter of Elizabeth Brooke and Fontaine Maury. Sons: William Maury (d.y.) and Dabney Herndon Maury. John Minor Maury was named after his ancestor, General John Minor. It is a name that continues through several generations. Matthew Fontaine Maury also had a nephew named (Lieutenant) John Minor Maury who was on the 1854 U S Navy Darien Expedition.

John served on the Essex and Essex Junior (captured, ex-HMS Atlantic.) He served on the "Essex Jr." in the Pacific, which brought home the survivors including Captain David Porter of the Essex which was destroyed in battle. John Minor Maury was promoted to first lieutenant, 1811; made flag captain to Commodore David Porter's fleet engaged in suppressing West Indian pirates, 1824.

During the War of 1812, he participated in the Battle of Lake Champlain under Commander Thomas Macdonough in the complete victory over the British flotilla, which was captured or sunk. John Minor Maury wrote to a friend in Fredericksburg, "We have gained a glorious victory. I hope the most important result of it will be to confirm the wavering allegiance of New York and Vermont to the Union. They have been threatening to secede unless peace be made with England on any terms!"

Soon after the close of the American war with England, the pirates of the West Indies had become a terror to all who sailed those seas. Captain David Porter (naval officer), then the most energetic and successful of our sailors, was ordered to fit out a squadron for their destruction. He was authorized to select his officers for a service so dangerous. His first choice was Lieut. John Minor Maury to be flag captain of the fleet. This officer, like the adjutant general of the army, gave orders for all the movements. The service was active and severe; the combats were desperate; no quarter was asked or given. The pirates were all destroyed or broken up and scattered.
 
As a mark of special approbation of his services, Lieutenant John Minor Maury was sent by Commander David Porter to bear to the United States Government his report of the complete success of his operations. John sailed in the store ship Decoy, but died of yellow fever in June 1824, just outside the Capes of Norfolk, and was buried at sea, at the age of twenty eight. John Minor Maury had been first lieutenant of a frigate; and at twenty-six he was the flag captain of the fleet, and was considered by Tatnall, Buchanan and other compeers to have been the youngest and smartest young sailor in the American navy.

See also
Piracy
Caribbean

Footnotes

1795 births
1828 deaths
Burials at sea
Deaths from yellow fever
Maury family of Virginia
Military personnel from Fredericksburg, Virginia
People who died at sea
United States Navy officers
United States Navy personnel of the War of 1812